Cosmin Saizu (born 8 March 2003) is a Romanian professional footballer who plays as a defender for Știința Miroslava. He made his Liga I debut on 7 November 2020, in a match between FC Voluntari and Politehnica Iași, won by Voluntari, score 4–0.

References

External links
 

2003 births
Living people
Sportspeople from Iași
Romanian footballers
Association football defenders
Liga I players
Liga III players
FC Politehnica Iași (2010) players
CS Știința Miroslava players